Flambards is a television series of 13 episodes which was broadcast in the United Kingdom in 1979 on ITV and in the United States in 1980. The series was based on the three Flambards novels of English author K. M. Peyton.

The series is set from 1909 to 1918 (World War I is still being fought at the end) and tells how the teenage heroine, the orphaned heiress Christina Parsons (Christine McKenna), comes to live at Flambards, the impoverished Essex estate owned by her crippled and tyrannical uncle, William Russell (Edward Judd), and his two sons, Mark (Steven Grives) and Will Russell (Alan Parnaby). Other cast members included Sebastian Abineri as Dick Wright, Anton Diffring as Mr Dermott, Rosalie Williams as Mary and Frank Mills as Fowler.

Four episodes were directed by Lawrence Gordon Clark, and four others by Michael Ferguson.

In 1980 Flambards was broadcast on American television by PBS who cut the series from 13 episodes to 12 by combining the first two episodes into one. PBS also added narration to the end and beginnings of episodes informing viewers of the events which had been affected by the cuts. In the late 1980s Flambards was shown on the A&E cable network in its full 13 episodes, but heavily commercial-edited.

Synopsis
The story revolves around Christina Parsons, coming of age in a tumultuous era, of old and new, of horses and aeroplanes, of foxhunts, class, suffragettes, death, war, love, loss, and rebuilding new lives out of the ashes of old ones.  The story begins with Christina, an orphan who has been shunted from one relative to the next since the age of 5, coming to live with her cousins and uncle at an estate in Essex called Flambards in 1909 at the age of 16.  Her crippled uncle (her mother's half-brother) William Russell is almost never referred to by his first name;  she calls him Uncle Russell, perhaps to avoid confusion with her cousin, also named William Russell. Her cousin William speculates that Russell plans for Christina to marry his son Mark in order to restore Flambards to its former glory using the money that she will inherit on her twenty-first birthday. Mark is as brutish as his father, with a great love for hunting, whereas the younger son William is terrified of horses after a hunting accident and aspires to be an early-era aviator. Christina soon finds friendship with the injured William, who challenges her ideas on class boundaries, as well as her love for horses and hunting. William and Christina eventually fall in love and run away to London from the hunt ball.

Cast
 Christine McKenna as Christina Parsons
 Steven Grives as Mark Russell
 Alan Parnaby as William Russell
 Edward Judd as Uncle Russell
 Frank Mills as Fowler
 Carol Leader as Dorothy
 Rosalie Williams as Mary 
 Anton Diffring as Mr. Dermot

Musical score

The series's memorable score was composed by David Fanshawe, who is most famous for his 1972 composition African Sanctus. Of his score for Flambards Fanshawe later wrote,

Flying scenes
For the aerial scenes radio controlled model period aircraft were used, the shots framed so that the small size of the aircraft was concealed.

References

External links

ITV television dramas
1970s British drama television series
Television series by ITV Studios
Television series by Yorkshire Television
1979 British television series debuts
1979 British television series endings
1970s British television miniseries
World War I television drama series
English-language television shows